Axumawit Alem Embaye (Amharic: አክሱማዊት አምባዬ; born 18 October 1994) is an Ethiopian middle-distance runner, who specialises in the 1500 metres. She is a two-time World Indoor Championship silver medallist from 2014 and 2022.

Career
Axumawit Embaye made her first major appearances in 2012. She was runner-up in the 800 m at the Ethiopian junior championships and ended up seventh at the 2012 World Junior Championships in Athletics, recording a personal best of 4:12.92 minutes. She switched to the 1500 metres for the 2013 season and performed well on the European circuit. She ran a best of 4:09.11 minutes at the XL Galan indoors to place second and had a string of runner-up placings outdoors at the Bislett Games, Folksam Grand Prix and the KBC Night of Athletics (she set a personal best of 4:05.16 minutes at the latter event).

Top three placings at the PSD Bank Meeting and Weltklasse in Karlsruhe at the start of the next year brought her a place on the team for the 2014 World Indoor Championships in the 1500 metres event. She was second to Abebe Aregawi in the heats and repeated that feat in the final; although Abebe comfortably won the race, Axumawit stayed ahead of the rest of the pack to take the silver medal.

She placed fourth in her specialist event at the 2016 IAAF World Indoor Championships held in Portland, Oregon. Sifan Hassan was the winner while Dawit Seyaum and Gudaf Tsegay finished second and third, respectively.

At the 2019 World Championships in Doha, Axumawit was eliminated in the heats of the women's 1500m event.

In 2022, Axumawit repeated her achievement from 2014 winning 1500m silver at the World Indoor Championships in Belgrade, clocking 4:02.29. Her compatriot Tsegay led an Ethiopian medals sweep in 3:57.19 as Hirut Meshesha finished third (4:03.39).

Competition record

Personal bests
 1500 metres – 3:59.02 (2019)
 1500 metres indoor – 4:02.12 (2022)
 One mile – 4:18.58 (2019)
 One mile indoor – 4:23.50 (2015)
 3000 metres – 8:43.83 (2018)
 3000 metres indoor – 8:49.52 (2017)

References

External links

Living people
1994 births
Ethiopian female middle-distance runners
World Athletics Indoor Championships medalists
21st-century Ethiopian women